Schürmann is a family name that comes from Old German language, meaning "one who shears," probably referring to sheep-shearing.

Notable people
 Clamor Wilhelm Schürmann (1815–1893), Lutheran missionary and linguist in South Australia
 David Schurmann (born 1974), film director
 Georg Caspar Schürmann ( 1672–1751), German composer
 Petra Schürmann (1933–2010), German actress, model, TV announcer and beauty queen 
 Pierre-André Schürmann (born 1960), Swiss football manager
 Reiner Schürmann (1941–1993), philosophy academic
 Vilfredo Schürmann (born 1948), Brazilian sailing explorer

See also 
 Schuermann, German firm of architects
 Schurman
 Scheuer
 Schuerman

German-language surnames
Occupational surnames